Robin McKinnon (born 19 December 1961) is a former Australian rules footballer who played for West Adelaide in the South Australian National Football League (SANFL).  McKinnon was selected by Hawthorn with pick 52 in the 1986 VFL draft, but did not move to Victoria and join the Hawthorn squad.

References

External links 

West Adelaide Football Club players
Australian rules footballers from South Australia
Living people
South Australian State of Origin players
People from Mount Gambier, South Australia
1961 births